Weini Kelati Frezghi (born 1 December 1996) is an Eritrean-American long-distance runner.
She became a US citizen in June 2021. Her transfer of allegiance made her eligible to represent the United States on June 23, 2021.

Professional
On 8 January 2022, Kelati placed second at 2022 USA Cross Country Championships over 10 km in San Diego, California.

Kelati is a two-time winner of the Manchester Road Race, where she set the course record in 2021 and defended her title in 2022.

On 16 October 2021, she set the American 10 KM record for a women’s-only race at the Boston 10K for Women in 31:18.

On 5 December 2020, she ran a 10,000 m race and qualified by Entry standard for the 2020 Summer Games, with a personal best time of 31:10.08, also an Eritrean national record – at JSerra Catholic High School, in San Juan Capistrano. But for her first participation to US Trials in Eugene, a few days after becoming American, she did not finish the 10,000 m.

She forwent the remainder of her collegiate eligibility and signed a professional contract in November 2020 with Under Armour's elite team, Dark Sky Distance.

NCAA
Weini Kelati is a 2019 NCAA Division I Cross Country Championships champion, 11-time All-American, and 7-time Mountain West Conference Champion.

She won the 10,000 m at the 2019 NCAA Outdoor Championships and won the 2019 NCAA Division I Cross Country Championships. She was named the Honda Sports Award recipient for cross country that year.

Prep
Kelati attended Heritage High School in Virginia and competed in cross country and track and field. She was the 2015 winner of Footlocker XC. 2015 Virginia state champion in cross country and 2016 outdoor 3200 m. Won 2016 New Balance Indoor Nationals 5000 m and 2 mile.

References

External links
 From a running start in Eritrea to a new home in America, Weini Kelati wins NCAA cross country title ESPN
 24-year-old Weini Kelati Sets New American Record During Women’s 10K Race In Boston CBS Boston
 Podcast interviews 
 Three days after becoming a U.S. citizen, she will run to become a U.S. Olympian The Washington Post
 

Living people
Place of birth missing (living people)
1996 births
Eritrean female middle-distance runners
Eritrean female long-distance runners
American female long-distance runners
21st-century American women
New Mexico Lobos women's track and field athletes